Eduardo Pérez Reyes (born 28 April 1993) is a Mexican professional footballer who plays as a forward for Liga MX club Santos Laguna.

Career statistics

Club

Honours
Cafetaleros
Ascenso MX: Clausura 2018

References

External links
 
  
 
 

Living people
1993 births
Mexican footballers
Association football forwards
Club Puebla players
Lobos BUAP footballers
Cafetaleros de Chiapas footballers
Tampico Madero F.C. footballers
FC Juárez footballers
Liga MX players
Ascenso MX players
Liga Premier de México players
Tercera División de México players
Footballers from Sinaloa
Sportspeople from Culiacán